Olivier Léonhardt (29 January 1964 – 2 February 2022) was a French politician. A member of the Socialist Party and later the Miscellaneous left, he served in the Senate from 2017 until his death. He died from cancer on  2 February 2022, at the age of 58.

References

1964 births
2022 deaths
Mayors of places in Île-de-France
French Senators of the Fifth Republic
People from Suresnes
Socialist Party (France) politicians